Propoxyphene (PPX) is a drug often prescribed to treat pain and is related structurally to methadone. Propoxyphene is generally taken orally and its effects peak in 1 – 2 hours. Overdose of propoxyphene effects the brain and can cause severe euphoria. Extended use of propoxyphene can cause respiratory depression, analgesia, stupor, and coma.

PPX may refer to:

 Dextropropoxyphene, an analgesic in the opioid category
 Exopolyphosphatase, a phosphatase enzyme
 Popular Science Predictions Exchange, an online virtual prediction market

Classification/schedule IV: Prolonged use of these drugs may lead to limited physical or psychological dependency; lower abuse potential than schedule III

Physical Dependency: High-Low

Psychological Dependency: High-Low

Tolerance: Yes

Possible Effects: Euphoria, drowsiness, respiratory depression, constricted pupils, nausea

Effects of Overdose: Slow and shallow breathing, clammy skin, convulsions, coma, possible death

Withdrawal Syndrome: Watery eyes, runny nose, yawning, loss of appetite, irritability, tremors, panic, cramps, nausea, chills and sweating